Krajno Brdo is a settlement northeast of Krašnja in the Municipality of Lukovica in the southeastern part of the Upper Carniola region of Slovenia.

References

External links

Krajno Brdo on Geopedia

Populated places in the Municipality of Lukovica